HD 194612 (HR 7812) is a solitary orange hued star located in the southern circumpolar constellation Octans. It has an apparent magnitude of 5.9, making it visible to the naked eye under ideal conditions.

This is a red giant with a stellar classification of K5 III, and Gaia DR3 stellar evolution models place it on the red giant branch. It has double the mass of the Sun and an enlarged radius of  due to its evolved status.

References

K-type giants
Octans
194612
101843
7812
PD-81 00906
Octantis, 49